USS Concord (AFS-5), was a , in service with the United States Navy from 1968 to 1992. Concord became the first of five ships of its class to be transferred to Military Sealift Command. The transfer was completed in October 1992 and she was redesignated USNS Concord (T-AFS-5). Concord was stricken in August 2009 and sunk as a target in 2012.

History
Concord was laid down on 26 March 1966 at the National Steel and Shipbuilding Company in San Diego, California. The ship was launched on 17 December 1966 and commissioned on 27 November 1968. On 18 August 1992, Concord was decommissioned and transferred to Military Sealift Command, and assigned to the Naval Fleet Auxiliary Force (PM1), MSC Far East.

After being stricken on 18 August 2009, Concord was sunk at 16:12 hrs (UTC-10) on 17 July 2012 as part of the SINKEX portion of Rim of the Pacific naval exercises.

References

 

Mars-class combat stores ships
Cold War auxiliary ships of the United States
Ships built in San Diego
1966 ships
Ships sunk as targets